The Southside is the part of Dublin city that lies south of the River Liffey. It is an informal but commonly used term. In comparison to the city's Northside, it has historically been regarded as wealthier and more privileged, with several notable exceptions. (Malahide, one of the wealthiest areas in Ireland, is on the Northside, for example.)

Areas of the Southside
The Southside includes Dublin city centre south of the Liffey, including Grafton Street and other notable streets, and also inner city areas such as The Liberties / The Coombe and Temple Bar.

Beyond the city centre, the Southside (in the geographical sense) includes the districts named here, most of the names being old, though many were until recent times rural townlands:

Postcodes 

Traditionally, Dublin postal districts on Southside begin with even numbers, while those of the Northside begin with odd numbers. College Green for example, is in the city's D02 district—simply called "Dublin 2" in everyday speech—whereas the outer suburb of Tallaght is in D24. One exception to this rule is the Phoenix Park, which forms part of the even-numbered district D08, but is actually on the Northside. Historian Pat Liddy explains this discrepancy: "Long before there were postal codes, the James's Street Postal Sorting Office looked after the Phoenix Park, because it was considered to be closer and more convenient than Phibsborough. James's Street continued in this role when the postal codes were introduced, so Dublin 8 it had to be." 

The outer edges of the Southside and substantial parts of Dun Laoghaire-Rathdown contain those new "A" postcode areas that have been assigned to southern Dublin (some "A" areas are situated in County Wicklow and County Meath and others lie across the Liffey in northern Fingal). These are separate from the traditional postal districts but have been unified with them under the new Eircode system. Blackrock, for example, is in Dublin A94, whereas Dun Laoghaire is in the A96 area. Since Eircode was implemented, Southside postal addresses now take two general forms, depending on whether they lie within the traditional postal district area or not. This is an example of a postal address within the traditional Dublin postal districts:
 The Shelbourne Hotel,
 27 St. Stephen's Green, 
 Dublin 2,
 D02 K224.

And this is an example of a Southside postal address from outside the traditional postal districts:

 The Mellow Fig,
 5A George's Avenue,
 Blackrock,
 County Dublin,
 A94 XK11.

See also

Dublin 4
Northside, Dublin
List of Eircode routing areas in Ireland

References

Sub-divisions of County Dublin